Jean-Jacques Provoyeur, aka "JJ", (born November 1950) is a South African sailor and yacht constructor. He competed in the BOC Challenge 1994-95 single single-handed round-the-world yacht race, which he completed in 133 days.

Racing
Fireball (dinghy) championships
BOC Challenge 1994-95 (now the Velux 5 Oceans Race)
1989–1990 Vendée Globe

Boatbuilding

Provoyeur has built numerous monohulls and catamarans, principally employing the cold-moulding and  Dudley Dix "radius chine plywood" techniques, using plywood and epoxy. Such vessels range from small sailing dinghies to large 60' racing yachts and 55' cruising catamarans such as the Dudley Dix DH550.

Personal life
Provoyeur is based in the Algarve, Portugal, and is married to Esther Provoyeur.

See also
 Dominique Provoyeur

External links

References

1950 births
Living people
South African male sailors (sport)
Sportspeople from Cape Town